Juan Carlos González Izurieta (born 13 November 1968) is a former Chilean footballer who played for Unión Española and Colo-Colo. He played as a defender.

Honours

Player
 Unión Española
Copa Chile (2): 1992, 1993

 Colo-Colo
Primera División de Chile (3): 1996, 1997 Clausura, 1998
Copa Chile (1): 1996

References
 Profile at BDFA 
 

1968 births
Living people
Chilean footballers
Chilean people of Basque descent
Chile international footballers
Colo-Colo footballers
Unión Española footballers
Chilean Primera División players
Association football defenders